Baidyapur Ramkrishna Vidyapith Baidyapur RK Vidyapith or BRV) is a higher secondary school in the village Baidyapur which is located in Purba Bardhaman district. A local jamindar named Kumar Krishna Nandi Chowdhuri donated the land to the school.

History

The present name of the school was taken  on 1 January 1948.
First President: Sri Panchanan Nandi
First Secretary: Sri Kumar Krishna Nandi Chowdhuri
Recognition for Class 11: 1957 
Recognition for Class 12: 1976
Books in Library at first: 862

Former Headmasters
Sri Nalinaksha Mukherjee(1913-1914)
Sri Jitendra Mitra
Sri Radhasundar Das
Sri Radhashyam Mitra
Sri Hemendranath Mitra
Sri Pranballabh Ray
Sri Bijan Bikash Bhattacharya
Sri Mantu Chandra Sadhukhan(1995-31.01.2011)
Sri Sujit Chatterjee(01.08.2014-2022)

Students
Students at first: 136
Students sat in first Govt. Examination: 8
Students passed: 7
Students passed in 1st Division: 2
Students passed in 2nd Division: 4

Sports
Cricket, Kabadi and Football are the main sports. 2015 is the greatest year for sports to this school. In this year, Rajib Gandhi Khel Ratna award was won by this school in Kalna-II Block stage in Football & Kabadi. The Kabbadi team has won the fourth place in Burdwan District stage.

Events

The functions held in this school are:
Teachers' Day of India
Annual Function
Annual Sports
Independence Day of India
Republic Day of India
Sarswati Puja

Notable alumni
Abdus Sattar (West Bengal politician)

References 

Boys' schools in India
Government schools in India
High schools and secondary schools in West Bengal
Education in Purba Bardhaman district
Educational institutions established in 1913
1913 establishments in India